The Usher of the Black Rod (often shortened to the Black Rod, and in some countries, formally known as the Gentleman Usher of the Black Rod if male or, Lady Usher of the Black Rod if female) is an official in the parliaments of several countries of the Commonwealth of Nations. The position originates in the House of Lords of the Parliament of the United Kingdom. Equivalent positions also exist in Australia, Canada, and New Zealand. 

The position is similar to one known as a serjeant-at-arms in other bodies.

Origin
The office was created in 1350 by royal letters patent, though the current title dates from 1522. The position was adopted by other members of the Commonwealth when they adopted the British Westminster system. The title is derived from the staff of office, an ebony staff topped with a golden lion, which is the main symbol of the office's authority.

A ceremonial rod or staff is a common type of symbol indicating the authority of the office holder. Depictions of ancient authority figures in many cultures include such a rod (alternatively called a sceptre). Another early example was the fasces (literally a bound bundle of rods) carried by guards ("lictors") who accompanied certain high-level officials in the Roman Republic and later Empire.

United Kingdom

In the United Kingdom, the Black Rod is principally responsible for controlling access to and maintaining order within the House of Lords and its precincts, as well as for ceremonial events within those precincts. Since early 2018, the post has been held for the first time by a woman, Sarah Clarke.

Appointment
Black Rod is formally appointed by the Crown based on a recruitment search performed by the Clerk of the Parliaments, who is the employer of all House of Lords officials. Prior to 2002, the office rotated among retired senior officers from the Royal Navy, the British Army and the Royal Air Force. It is now advertised openly. Black Rod is an officer of the English Order of the Garter, and is usually appointed Knight Bachelor if not already knighted. Their deputy is the Yeoman Usher of the Black Rod.

Official duties
Black Rod is principally responsible for controlling access to and maintaining order within the House of Lords and its precincts, as well as for ceremonial events within those precincts. Previous responsibilities for security, and the buildings and services of the Palace of Westminster, have been passed, respectively, to the Parliamentary Security Director (as of the post's creation in January 2016) and Lords Director of Facilities (as of that post's creation and the retirement of the then-Black Rod in May 2009).

Black Rod's official duties also include responsibility as the usher and doorkeeper at meetings of the Most Noble Order of the Garter; the personal attendant of the Sovereign in the Lords; as secretary to the Lord Great Chamberlain and as the Serjeant-at-Arms and Keeper of the Doors of the House, in charge of the admission of strangers to the House of Lords. Either Black Rod or their deputy, the Yeoman Usher, is required to be present when the House of Lords, the upper house of Parliament, is in session, and plays a role in the introduction of all new Lords Temporal in the House (but not of bishops as new Lords Spiritual). Black Rod also arrests any Lord guilty of breach of privilege or other Parliamentary offence, such as contempt or disorder, or the disturbance of the House's proceedings. Their equivalent in the House of Commons is the Serjeant at Arms.

Former Black Rod David Leakey said that 30% of his work as Black Rod was within or for the House of Commons.

Black Rod, along with their deputy, is responsible for organising ceremonial events within the Palace of Westminster, providing leadership in guiding the significant logistics of running such events.

Ceremonial duties

Mace
Black Rod is in theory responsible for carrying the Mace into and out of the chamber for the Speaker of the House of Lords (formerly the Lord Chancellor, now the Lord Speaker), though this role is delegated to the Yeoman Usher and Deputy Serjeant-at-Arms, or on judicial occasions, to the Lord Speaker's deputy, the Assistant Serjeant-at-Arms. The mace was introduced in 1876.

State Opening of Parliament
Black Rod is best known for their part in the ceremonies surrounding the State Opening of Parliament and the Speech from the throne. Black Rod summons the Commons to attend the speech and lead them to the Lords. As part of the ritual, the doors to the chamber of the House of Commons are slammed in the approaching Black Rod's face. This is to symbolise the Commons' independence of the Sovereign. Black Rod then strikes the door three times with their staff, and is then admitted and issues the summons of the monarch to attend.

This ritual also happens whenever the Lords have a commission to be read and Black Rod summons MPs to hear it. For example, on Tuesday 17 December 2019 this ritual happened twice.

This ritual is derived from the attempt by King Charles I to arrest Five Members in 1642, in what was seen as a breach of the constitution. This and prior actions of the King led to the Civil War. After that incident, the House of Commons has maintained its right to question the right of the monarch's representative to enter their chamber, although they cannot bar them from entering with lawful authority.

List of Black Rods in England, Great Britain and the UK from 1361

This list is derived from one published by the Parliamentary Archives in 2011, with alterations from later research.

 c.1361–1387: Walter Whitehorse
 1387–1399: John Cray
 1399–1410: Thomas Sy
 1410–1413: John Sheffield
 1413–1415: John Athelbrigg
 1415–1418: William Hargroave
 1418–1423: John Clifford
 1423–1428: John Carsons
 1428–1459: William Pope
 1438–1459: Robert Manfield (joint)
 1459–1461: John Penycok
 1461–1471: Vacant ?
 1471–1485: William Evington
 1483–1485: Edward Hardgill (joint)
 1485–1489: Robert Marleton
 1489–1513: Ralph Assheton
 1495–30 December 1511: Hugh Denys (jointly with Assheton until Denys's death)
 1513–1526: Sir William Compton
 1526–1536: Henry Norreys
 1536–1543: Anthony Knyvett
 1543–1554: Sir Philip Hoby
 1554–1565: John Norreys
 1554–1591: Sir William Norreys (joint)
 1591–1593: Anthony Wingfield
 1593–1598: Simon Bowyer
 1598–1620: Richard Coningsby
 1605–1620: George Pollard (joint)
 1620–1642: James Maxwell
 1642–1649: Alexander Thayne (as recognised by Parliament); jointly with James Maxwell until c. 1646. The Lords was abolished in 1649 and Thayne made a claim to the title at the Restoration in 1661, but was denied.
 2 March 1645 – 1661: Peter Newton (as recognised by the Royalists; Edward Ellis discharged the duties in 1642 and Newton in 1644, but neither seems to have been formally appointed at the time.)
 1671–1675: Sir John Ayton
 1671–1683: Sir Edward Carteret
 1683–25 April 1694: Sir Thomas Duppa
 1694–25 August 1698: Sir Fleetwood Sheppard
 5 December 1698 – 1 June 1710: Admiral Sir David Mitchell
 1710–1718: Sir William Oldes
 1718–1727: Sir William Sanderson, 1st Baronet
 1727–1747: Sir Charles Dalton
 1747–1760: Sir Henry Bellenden
 1760 – 6 September 1765: Sir Septimus Robinson
 1765 – 1812: Sir Francis Molyneux, 7th Baronet
 1812 – 25 July 1832: Sir Thomas Tyrwhitt
 25 July 1832 – 8 February 1877: Admiral Sir Augustus Clifford
 3 May 1877 – 23 June 1883: General Sir William Knollys
 24 July 1883 – 7 October 1895: Admiral Sir James Drummond
 16 December 1895 – 23 July 1901: General Sir Michael Biddulph
 August 1904 – 16 December 1919: Admiral Sir Henry Stephenson
 January 1920 – 14 May 1941: Lieutenant-General Sir William Pulteney
 October 1941 – 15 August 1944: Air Chief Marshal Sir William Mitchell
 January 1945 – 18 January 1949: Vice Admiral Sir Geoffrey Blake
 18 January 1949 – 18 June 1963: Lieutenant-General Sir Brian Horrocks
 18 June 1963 – October 1970: Air Chief Marshal Sir George Mills
 October 1970 – 18 January 1978: Admiral Sir Frank Twiss
 10 January 1978 – January 1985: Lieutenant-General Sir David House
 January 1985 – January 1992: Air Chief Marshal Sir John Gingell
 January 1992 – 8 May 1995: Admiral Sir Richard Thomas
 9 May 1995 – 8 May 2001: General Sir Edward Jones
 9 May 2001 – 30 April 2009: Lieutenant-General Sir Michael Willcocks
 30 April 2009 – 28 October 2010: Lieutenant-General Sir Frederick Viggers
 21 December 2010 – 21 December 2017: Lieutenant-General David Leakey
 12 February 2018 – present: Sarah Clarke

List of Serjeants-at-Arms of the House of Lords
Technically the serjeant at arms attending the Lord Chancellor (the former presiding officer of the House of Lords) was regarded as an officer of the House of Lords. He was appointed for life until 1713 and during good behaviour thereafter, originally receiving a daily remuneration and from 1806 an annual salary. The post was merged with that of Black Rod in 1971.

The following is a list of Serjeants-at-Arms of the House of Lords since 1660:

 1660: Humphrey Leigh
 1668: Edward Wood (in Extraordinary; did not succeed to the reversion)
 1671: Sir George Charnock (in Extraordinary)
 1673: Sir George Charnock (in Ordinary) jointly with Roger Charnock
 1697: Peter Persehouse
 1713: Sarles Goatley
 1713: Charles Stone
 1716: Francis Jephson
 1745: Richard Jephson
 1789: William Watson
 1818: George Francis Seymour
 1841: Alexander Perceval
 1858: Colonel Sir Wellington Patrick Manvers Chetwynd Talbot
 1899: Major-General Sir Arthur Edward Augustus Ellis
 1901: Lieutenant-Colonel Sir Fleetwood Isham Edwards
 1910: Major-General Sir Stanley de Astel Clarke
 5 November 1910: Captain Sir Seymour John Fortescue
 1 February 1936: Major-General Sir Charles Edward Corkran
 17 March 1939: Admiral Sir Herbert Meade-Fetherstonhaugh
 2 December 1946: Air Vice-Marshal Sir Paul Copeland Maltby
 17 March 1962: Captain Kenneth Lachlan Mackintosh
 1 January 1971: Admiral Sir Frank Twiss
Since 1971 the office of Serjeant at Arms has been held by the Gentleman Usher of the Black Rod.

Black Rods outside the UK
As in the United Kingdom, Black Rods in other parliaments is responsible for arresting any senator or intruder who disrupts the proceedings.

Australia
The Australian Senate and the upper houses in five Australian states and territories have their own Usher of the Black Rod. (Queensland abolished its upper house and the assemblies of the Northern Territory and Australian Capital Territory have always been unicameral.)

The current Usher of the Black Rod for the Australian Senate is John Begley. In the Australian Senate, the Usher of the Black Rod assists with the administration and security of the Senate and has the power to take anyone into custody who causes a disturbance in or near the Senate chamber.

Canada

The Usher of the Black Rod for the Senate of Canada is the equivalent to the Black Rod office for the House of Lords. The position was also known as the Gentleman Usher of the Black Rod until 1997, when the appointment of the first female Black Rod prompted the word gentleman to be dropped from the title.

The provincial legislatures of Saskatchewan, British Columbia, Alberta, New Brunswick, and Prince Edward Island have also incorporated the position of the Black Rods into their respective parliamentary systems.

New Zealand

In New Zealand, where the Legislative Council was abolished in 1951, the Usher of the Black Rod continues to summon MPs to the chamber for the Throne Speech. It is not a full-time position.

Arthur Bothamley  was the first person to hold the role; he was usher of the black rod for 45 years from 1892 until August 1937. In September 1937, he was succeeded by Captain Douglas Bryan, who retired in June 1957. John Everitt Seal took over from Bryan in June 1957 and held the role until his death on 1 November 1964. Alexander John Mackay Manson was appointed in May 1965 to succeed Seal in time for the opening of the second term of the 34th New Zealand Parliament later that month. Manson retired in June 1971. In May 1972, Melville Harvey Scott Innes-Jones was appointed to succeed Manson. Innes-Jones retired in 1991.

Colonel William "Bill" Nathan, OBE, ED, appointed in 1993, was the first Māori Gentleman Usher of the Black Rod. Colonel Nathan retired in 2005, and was followed by Major David Baguley. David Williams was appointed as the acting Usher of the Black Rod in 2017 for the opening of the 52nd New Zealand Parliament. Commander Sandra "Sandy" McKie was appointed to act in the role in 2020 for the opening of the 53rd Parliament, the first woman to hold the position. McKie was permanently appointed to the role effective from 17 October 2022, following the formal retirement of Major Baguley.

Former

Ireland
Before the Act of Union of 1800, which united the Kingdom of Ireland with the Kingdom of Great Britain to form the United Kingdom of Great Britain and Ireland, there was also a Black Rod in the Irish House of Lords. From 1783 the Irish Black Rod was also Usher of the Order of St Patrick, so the office continued after the Union. No one was appointed to the office after the creation of the Irish Free State in December 1922.

1707: Andrew Fountaine
c.1708–1709: Thomas Ellys
1711–17??: Brinsley Butler, 1st Viscount Lanesborough (died 1735)
1745–17??: Robert Langrishe
1745–1747: Solomon Dayrolles
1747–17??: William FitzWilliam
1757: James Gisborne
1761–1763: George Montagu
1763–1765: Sir Archibald Edmonstone
1772?: Robert Weston
1780–1781: Sir John Lees
1783: Sir John Freemantle
1783–1784: Sir Willoughby Ashton 
1784–1790: Colonel Andrew Barnard
1787–1789: Scrope Morland
1790–1796: The Honourable Henry Fane
1796–1799: Nicholas Price
1799–1806: Thomas Linsay
1806–1835: Sir Charles Hawley Vernon
1835–1838: Major The Honourable Sir Francis Charles Stanhope
1838–1841: Sir William Edward Leeson
1841–1858: Lieutenant Colonel Sir George Morris
1858–1878: Sir George Burdett L'Estrange
1879–1913: Colonel James Alfred Caulfeild, 7th Viscount Charlemont
1915–1917: Sir John Olphert
1918–1933: Sir Samuel Murray Power

The Senate of Northern Ireland had a Black Rod throughout its existence, until the disbandment of the Parliament of Northern Ireland in 1972.

South Africa
The Senate of South Africa had a Gentleman Usher of the Black Rod from its inception in 1910 to abolition in 1980. When the Senate was restored in 1994 the renamed position of Usher of the Black Rod returned with it, continuing in the new National Council of Provinces.

Related ushers
Before the Acts of Union 1707 united the English and Scottish parliaments, there was a Heritable Usher of the White Rod who had a similar role in the Estates of Parliament in Scotland. This office is currently held by The Rt Rev. John Armes, Bishop of Edinburgh, but the role carries no duties.

Gentleman ushers exist for all the British orders of chivalry, and are coloured as follows:
 The Gentleman Usher of the Black Rod – Most Noble Order of the Garter
 The Gentleman Usher of the Green Rod – Most Ancient and Most Noble Order of the Thistle
 The Gentleman Usher of the Scarlet Rod – Most Honourable Order of the Bath
 The Gentleman Usher of the Blue Rod – Most Distinguished Order of Saint Michael and Saint George
 The Gentleman Usher of the Purple Rod – Most Excellent Order of the British Empire

References

External links
 The records of Black Rod's Department are held by the UK Parliamentary Archives
 The British Parliament's information about the Gentleman Usher of the Black Rod
 The Canadian Parliament's information about Black Rod
 The Australian Parliamentary Education Office's information about the Usher of the Black Rod

Ushers of the Black Rod
Westminster system
Positions within the British Royal Household
Officers of the House of Lords of the United Kingdom
Ceremonial officers in the United Kingdom